Acraea annonae is a butterfly in the family Nymphalidae. It is found in the Democratic Republic of the Congo (Shaba).

Taxonomy
It is a member of the Acraea acrita species group.

Other views

Acraea (group acrita) Henning, 1993 
Acraea (subgenus Rubraea) Henning & Williams, 2010 
Acraea (Acraea) (subgroup acrita) Pierre & Bernaud, 2013 
Acraea (Acraea)  Groupe egina Pierre & Bernaud, 2014

References

Butterflies described in 1987
annonae
Endemic fauna of the Democratic Republic of the Congo
Butterflies of Africa